An election was held on November 6, 2018 to elect all 110 members to Michigan's House of Representatives. The election coincided with elections for other offices, including U.S. Senate, U.S. House of Representatives, Governor and Senate. The primary election was held on August 7, 2018.

Republicans retained control of the House, despite losing the popular vote, after a net loss of five seats, winning 58 seats compared to 52 seats for the Democrats.

Term-limited members
Under the Michigan Constitution, members of the state Senate are able to serve only two four-year terms, and members of the House of Representatives are limited to three two-year terms, some of the toughest term-limit laws in the country. After the 2018 mid-term elections, nearly 70 percent of the state Senate and 20 percent of the state House were forced to leave office because of term-limits. The following members were prevented by term-limits from seeking re-election to the House in 2018. This list does not include members that were eligible for re-election, but instead sought other office or voluntarily retired.

Democrats (13)
2nd District: Bettie Cook Scott
4th District: Rose Mary Robinson
16th District: Robert Kosowski
25th District: Henry Yanez
29th District: Brenda Carter
48th District: Pam Faris
49th District:	Phil Phelps
55th District:	Adam Zemke
67th District: Tom Cochran
68th District:	Andy Schor
69th District: Sam Singh
76th District:	Winnie Brinks
110th District: Scott Dianda

Republicans (11)
39th District:	Klint Kesto
40th District:	Mike McCready
41st District:	Martin Howrylak
51st District: Joe Graves
74th District:	Rob VerHeulen
78th District:	Dave Pagel
81st District:	Dan Lauwers
88th District:	Roger Victory
91st District:	Holly Hughes
93rd District:	Tom Leonard
94th District:	Tim Kelly

Results

Statewide
Statewide results of the 2018 Michigan House of Representatives:

District
Results of the 2018 Michigan House of Representatives election by district:

General election

Districts 1-28

Districts 29-55

Districts 56-83

Districts 84-110

Notes

See also
2018 Michigan Senate election

References

External links
2018 Michigan Primary Election Ballot

Michigan House of Representatives
House of Representatives
2018
November 2018 events in the United States